Maligakanda Grama Niladhari Division is a Grama Niladhari Division of the Colombo Divisional Secretariat of Colombo District of Western Province, Sri Lanka.

Dharmasoka College, Ananda College, Ministry of Fisheries and Aquatic Resources Development, Maradana, Zahira College, Colombo, St. John's College, Colombo, Panchikawatte, Trace City, Nalanda College, Colombo and Sri Lanka Institute of Advanced Technological Education are located within, nearby or associated with Maligakanda.

Maligakanda is a surrounded by the Maradana, Panchikawatta, Maligawatta West, Kuppiyawatta East and Kuppiyawatta West Grama Niladhari Divisions.

Demographics

Ethnicity 

The Maligakanda Grama Niladhari Division has a Moor majority (69.9%) and a significant Sinhalese population (23.2%). In comparison, the Colombo Divisional Secretariat (which contains the Maligakanda Grama Niladhari Division) has a Moor plurality (40.1%), a significant Sri Lankan Tamil population (31.1%) and a significant Sinhalese population (25.0%)

Religion 

The Maligakanda Grama Niladhari Division has a Muslim majority (71.6%) and a significant Buddhist population (23.5%). In comparison, the Colombo Divisional Secretariat (which contains the Maligakanda Grama Niladhari Division) has a Muslim plurality (41.8%), a significant Hindu population (22.7%), a significant Buddhist population (19.0%) and a significant Roman Catholic population (13.1%)

Gallery

References 

Grama Niladhari Divisions of Colombo Divisional Secretariat